A naming controversy or naming dispute is a controversy surrounding terminology:
Geographical naming disputes
Ethnonymy
List of ethnic slurs
List of religious slurs